CocoRosie is an American musical group formed in 2003 by sisters Sierra Rose "Rosie" and Bianca Leilani "Coco" Casady. The group's music has been described as folktronica, freak folk and "New Weird America", and incorporates elements of pop, blues, opera, electronica, and hip hop. The group has released seven studio albums, La Maison de Mon Rêve (2004), Noah's Ark (2005), The Adventures of Ghosthorse and Stillborn (2007), Grey Oceans (2010), Tales of a GrassWidow (2013), Heartache City (2015), and Put the Shine On (2020), and two EPs, Beautiful Boyz (2004) and Coconuts, Plenty of Junk Food (2009). They released their sixth album Heartache City on their own record label, Lost Girl Records.

Originally a duo, the group was formed when Bianca, who was living in New York City at the time, made an impromptu visit to Sierra at her Paris apartment, reconnecting with her for the first time in ten years. The sisters began creating music together, singing over instrumentals produced using a combination of traditional instruments and found objects, most notably children's toys. They later expanded to a group and added various backing musicians, including a bassist, keyboardist, beatboxer, and synth player.

CocoRosie has performed and toured in North America, South America, and at many prominent European venues and festivals such as the Olympia, the Grand Rex, the Royal Concertgebouw, Pukkelpop, and Lowlands Festival. In 2009, music magazine Better Propaganda named CocoRosie the 16th "most influential" artist of the 2000s.

Early life
Sierra Casady was born on June 9, 1980 in Fort Dodge, Iowa, and Bianca Casady on March 27, 1982 in Hilo, Hawaii. Their parents divorced when Sierra was four and Bianca was two  and the self-identified "part Native American" sisters stayed with their late mother, Christina Chalmers, Iowan artist, singer, Steiner/Waldorf teacher, and "healer" of Syrian Orthodox ancestry who "compulsively moved" and "kept throwing away everything the family owned and starting all over again." Chalmers nicknamed Sierra "Rosie" and Bianca "Coco" from which CocoRosie takes its name. Their mother's partner was the New Age spiritual leader and Native American impostor Brooke Medicine Eagle, whom Bianca has said "carried [her] in a papoose around sacred Anasazi grounds" as a child.

Their childhood has been described as "bizarre" and "nomadic". They moved almost yearly, living in Hawaii, Arizona, California and New Mexico, and frequently changed schools. Because their mother believed they would learn more "in the real world" than in school, neither sister finished high school. The sisters were somewhat estranged from their father, Timothy Casady, Iowan farmer, teacher, and spiritualist a who was interested in new age experiences inspired by Native American religions, neoshamanism, and "the Peyote Church, which involves ingesting the hallucinogenic cactus peyote." The sisters spent some childhood summers with him, where they experienced him, "dragging us on vision quests ... as a little kid, sometimes it's a nightmare, you're out in the desert, you don't have any food". In 1994, at 14, Sierra was kicked out of the home by Chalmers and went to live with her father in Sedona, where she began attending private boarding school Verde Valley School and lost contact with Bianca.Bianca also attended Verde Valley School.

In a 2004 interview, Bianca described their childhood, stating "we spent our summers hiking from reservation to reservation... I remember being in peyote circles as a kid, sitting in tepees full of smoke... not being able to breathe and trying to sneak air out of the bottom of the tepee... We always felt pretty much like freaks, but we felt good about it. We didn't have any rules or anything. We had total freedom. It was hard to meet people who had the same values as us. We just sort of carry that with us today. We have pow-wows in our apartment, with bottles of cheap beer. It has to manifest itself somehow."

Musical influence 
At the time, the sisters generally disliked their childhood experiences, but came to appreciate aspects of them that would later influence CocoRosie's music. In a 2007 interview, Sierra stated that the track "Rainbowarriors" from their third album The Adventures of Ghosthorse and Stillborn is "based on personal experiences and the Native American idea of the rainbow trail, but our own interpretation of that," and, in another 2007 interview, said that she and Bianca refer to themselves as "rainbowarriors". Later, in a 2015 interview with PopMatters discussing their sixth album Heartache City, Bianca stated that she felt she didn't have "certain rights" as child, and that she and Sierra "didn't really have the space to be children." She explained that in their music they "explore... expressing from a child's point of view... because a child sees what's going on around them but doesn't really judge, and tends to reflect back certain ugliness and then they also don't have shame necessarily, or certain social restrictions on the way that they talk."

In a 2007 interview, discussing the track lyrics of The Adventures of Ghosthorse and Stillborn, Bianca briefly mentioned that as child she "would burn ants and hunt rabbits" with Sierra, and that on the album is "talk about family members and our experiences... It’s not about what we have been doing, more major experiences, like moments from our childhood."

The Casady sisters' mother, Christina Chalmers, died in March 2020 during the production of CocoRosie's seventh album, Put the Shine On, eleven days after providing backing vocals for the track "Ruby Red", which is about her life.

Career

2003−2004: Formation and La Maison de Mon Rêve 
In 2000, after having lived in New York City for two years, Sierra moved into a "tiny" apartment in the Montmartre district of Paris, France to study at the Conservatoire de Paris, pursuing a career as an opera singer. Casady cheated to gain entrance to the Conservatoire, stating "I pretended I could sight-read when I couldn't." During this period she had no contact with Bianca, who by 2002 was living in Brooklyn and studying linguistics, sociology, and visual arts. Bianca had been "really involved in the literary community" in New York, claiming she "had a small press, was making books and hosting book clubs and curating shows" in her home. According to a 2007 Clash interview, the sisters had "hardly spoke a word to each other for ten years" at that point, with Bianca saying they "had seen each other a few times, but... abstained from speaking to each other. It was less of children being split up and more of us choosing not to connect."

In early 2003, Bianca made an impromptu visit to Paris to rejoin Sierra, and the two spent months creating music in Sierra's bathroom which, according to them, was the most isolated room in the apartment and had the best acoustics. The sisters took a lo-fi and experimental approach to production, utilizing a distinct vocal style, traditional instruments, and various improvised instruments such as toys, all recorded with one microphone and a "broken" pair of headphones. In a 2009 interview, Bianca stated that the decision to make music was also impromptu, and that after reuniting they had been "doing a lot of photography and started to just sort of document our daily adventures... recording was just sort of a natural progression of that... at no point were we, you know, aware of the goal of making a record... we intuitively really kind of stuck to that format without knowing it, like by making twelve songs and kind of thinking of it as that structure." The individual tracks created in the process were compiled into an album which would later be released as CocoRosie's debut, La Maison de Mon Rêve.

Initially, the sisters wanted only a few copies of the album to be produced, planning to give the copies to friends. However, the CocoRosie act was signed to the independent record label Touch and Go Records in 2004, after the label allegedly "pursued them" and persuaded them to, and the album was released on March 9, 2004 to unexpected critical acclaim.

2005−2006: Beautiful Boyz and Noah's Ark 
CocoRosie released their second album, Noah's Ark, in 2005. The album includes collaborations with Anohni from Antony and the Johnsons ("Beautiful Boyz"), Devendra Banhart ("Brazilian Sun"), and French rapper Spleen ("Bisounours"). The album was recorded in a variety of locations as the sisters traveled. The album's cover, a drawing by Bianca of three unicorns having sex while one of them vomits drops corresponding to the color spectrum, was selected by The Guardian and Pitchfork Media as one of the worst album covers of all time.

As of 2005, Bianca Casady was in a relationship with Devendra Banhart, with Banhart living with Bianca Casady and her mother Christina at their farm in Saintes-Maries-de-la-Mer, a Romani village in southern France.

In 2006, Sierra started a side project, Metallic Falcons, with friend Matteah Baim. The project is signed to Voodoo Eros Records, a new label started by Bianca with business partner Melissa Shimkovitz. Bianca also opened the Voodoo Eros Museum Of Nice Items, an art gallery and performance space in New York City (123 Ludlow St) most recently home to an exhibition of Bianca's art Red Bone Slim VS. Itself: an Exhibition of Drawings.

2007: The Adventures of Ghosthorse and Stillborn 
CocoRosie's third full-length studio album, The Adventures of Ghosthorse and Stillborn, was released on April 10, 2007. It was produced by Valgeir Sigurðsson, Björk's longtime collaborator. The songs are about the Casady sisters' family and their deceased older half-brother Simon Casady. It was recorded at their mother's farm in the Camargue region of France. The album's cover is a photo by Pierre et Gilles that features Sierra as two women, and Bianca in drag. In a 2008 interview with AfterEllen.com, Bianca expressed surprise that many people do not realize she is queer, given that she frequently performs in drag.

In May 2007, while touring in support of The Adventures of Ghosthorse and Stillborn, the band was involved in an incident which resulted in the cancellation of the remainder of the North American leg of the tour. No official explanation was released; vague and unconfirmed reports claimed that unidentified members of the band were arrested and deported while crossing the Canada–US border.

2008: "God Has a Voice, She Speaks Through Me" 
On May 13, 2008, CocoRosie released a new single entitled "God Has a Voice, She Speaks Through Me". The song was released digitally and as a 7" picture disc single (limited to 3000 pieces). The B-side of the 7" features a short and untitled song, which merely consists of noises. Though the picture on the B-side of the vinyl has lyrics from the song "Hairnet Paradise", which was previously only performed live, the actual song on the recording is very different. The duo spent much of 2008 writing and recording in various locations such as New York city, Réunion, Paris and Berlin where they also teamed up with artist Neda Sanai that is the spoken word voice on the song "R.I.P Burn Face".

2009: Coconuts, Plenty of Junk Food 
In 2009, CocoRosie's relationship with Touch and Go Records became unclear. A self-released EP entitled Coconuts, Plenty of Junk Food was made available for sale exclusively at CocoRosie shows on June 3, 2009.

2010−2012: Grey Oceans 
CocoRosie signed with Sub Pop records in 2010. Their fourth full-length album, Grey Oceans, was released on May 11, 2010.

2013−2014: Tales of a GrassWidow 
On June 5, 2012, CocoRosie released their double A-Side 7" single, "We Are On Fire", with Touch and Go Records. The cover art for the new single was a Twin Rivers collaboration between Bianca and Jesse Hazelip. Their fifth album, Tales of a GrassWidow, was released in the United States on May 27, 2013 on the City Slang record label.

2015−2016: Heartache City and Bianca Casady and the C.i.A. 
On February 6, 2015, the group confirmed on Twitter that they were working on a new album. Bianca later confirmed on Twitter that she was working on an upcoming solo album. In August 2015, CocoRosie announced that their album, Heartache City was set for release in late 2015. The group also released a behind the scenes video on their YouTube account of themselves in the studio recording two songs for the album, "Hairnet Paradise" and "Big and Black." On July 10, 2015, CocoRosie released a live version of a new song entitled "Heartache City" on their SoundCloud account, with the studio version to be released on their upcoming sixth album. Shortly after, CocoRosie posted the full album to stream on their SoundCloud page. It was premiered on The Fader. The duo also released the music video for new song "Lost Girls" on Facebook. The album was eventually released in October 2015.

In October 2015, Bianca announced details of her solo project, Bianca Casady and the C.i.A, also featuring Takuya Nakamura (bass guitar and trumpet), Doug Wieselman (clarinet and e-guitar), Lacy Lancaster (drums), Jean-Marc Ruellan (piano) and Bino Sauitzvy (dance).

CocoRosie have been frequent collaborators of American avant-garde theatre director Robert Wilson, composing scores to his award-winning international productions including "Peter Pan" (2013) at the Berliner Ensemble, "Pushkin's Fairy Tales" (2015) in Moscow, "Edda" (2017) at the Norske Theater in Oslo and "The Jungle Book" (2019) in Luxembourg. They have also performed at The Watermill Center.

2017: "Smoke 'em Out" and subsequent album Put the Shine On
On January 17, 2017, the group released the single "Smoke 'em Out" featuring Anohni, a protest song against the presidential election of Donald Trump, while also confirming that they had started working on their next album, Put the Shine On.

Other work

Word to the Crow 
An article in the April 5, 2007 issue of Czech magazine HIS Voice about The Adventures of Ghosthorse and Stillborn mentioned a previously unknown body of work, created by the Casady sisters, titled Word to the Crow. Shortly after, on April 13, an article about CocoRosie on Czech news website Aktuálně claimed that on the day before the release of La Maison de Mon Rêve, the sisters recorded an "improvised rap album" of the same title. It is unknown where the claim originated.

On May 3, 2009, Portuguese music blog mojorising claimed that the sisters recorded "a hip hop album" titled Word to the Crow "just a few days before" recording La Maison de Mon Rêve, and later on May 21, the official website of the Byblos International Festival published an article claiming that the sisters had "completed... a hip hop recording" of the same title prior to recording La Maison de Mon Rêve. On June 19, 2011, Russian blog lisaalya claimed that Word to the Crow was a "hip-hop record" and a "full album", recorded at the same time and in the same location as La Maison de Mon Rêve. On April 17, 2014, the claim was added to CocoRosie's "artist description" on Last.fm and on June 19, 2018, All American Entertainment website and booking agency AAE Music added the claim to their description of the group. Despite a mild degree of circulation, no evidence to support the existence of the album has surfaced, and the Casady sisters have never spoken about such an album.

The track "The Moon asked the Crow" from the 2010 album Grey Oceans, described by critics as "a surreal mixture of classical tinkling... accompanied by a juddering hip-hop bounce" and "baroque piano noodling with a thumping, body-moving hip-hop beat", as well as having "hip-hop elements", a "moody, hip hop-inherited boom-boom-clap beat" and a "catchy hip-hoppy beat", could be inspired by or derived from the style of, if it exists, Word to the Crow. Crows are also referenced in the Grey Oceans track "Fairy Paradise" and the Put the Shine On tracks "Smash My Head" and "Hell's Gate".

Commercial use 
CocoRosie has composed film scores for the 2005 French film Frankie and the 2007 German film Haus der Wünsche (international: Paperbird).

The track "Candyland" was used in the 2007 film Anna M.. The tracks "Bear Hides and Buffalo" and "Bloody Twins" are used in the 2008 gay zombie film Otto; or Up with Dead People by Bruce LaBruce. The tracks "Miracle", "Beautiful Boys", and "Honey or Tar" are used in the 2011 documentary Whores' Glory by Michael Glawogger. Sound illustrator Frédéric Sanchez used the tracks "Brazilian Sun", "Good Friday", and "Not for Sale" on the soundtrack for Miuccia Prada's Spring 2006 show, titling the piece "Coco Rosie Through the Looking Glass". The track "The Moon asked the Crow" was used in the Milan Fashion Week SS10 Runway soundtrack. The track "Werewolf" is sung repeatedly throughout the Swedish rendition of Shakespeare's Hamlet at the Royal Dramatic Theatre.

Personal life
In August 2021, the Casady family house burned down in a forest fire. Bianca stated that "The fire took everything, our family history in a material sense, all of our mother’s artwork and possessions, all of our family photographs, our collection of musical instruments and recording equipment, our costumes and on and on..." Although insurance covered the cost of rebuilding the house, it did not cover other expenses such as the cost of the music studio or musical instruments, so the Casady sisters launched a GoFundMe to cover costs.

Politics
Bianca Casady has signed the "Musicians for Palestine" statement in solidarity with the Palestinian movement.

Discography

Albums

Extended plays

Singles

Music videos
 "Noah's Ark"
 "Rainbowarriors"
 "God Has a Voice, She Speaks Through Me"
 "Lemonade"
 "Gallows"
 "We Are On Fire"
 "After The Afterlife"
 "Child Bride"
 "Gravediggress"
 "Restless"
 "Lost Girls"
 "Smash My Head"
 "GO AWAY!"

References

Further reading

External links

 Homepage
 Touch and Go/Quarterstick Records
 Cityslang Records
 New York Times Magazine profile, 2008
 CocoRosie video interview, 2010

All-female bands
American people of Syrian descent
American people who self-identify as being of Native American descent
American pop music groups
Casady family
LGBT-themed musical groups
Sibling musical duos
Sub Pop artists
Touch and Go Records artists
Freak folk
Musical groups established in 2003
City Slang artists
American musical duos
Folk music duos
Female musical duos